Waleed Murad was a UAE football player.

He was transferred to Al Wasl FC from Al-Nasr Sports Club in summer 2008.

References

2017 deaths
Al-Wasl F.C. players
Al-Nasr SC (Dubai) players
Hatta Club players
Emirati footballers
UAE First Division League players
UAE Pro League players
Association football forwards
Date of birth missing
1981 births